Pseudomonas lundensis is a Gram-negative, rod-shaped bacterium that often causes spoilage of milk, cheese, meat, and fish. Based on 16S rRNA analysis, P. lundensis has been placed in the P. chlororaphis group.

References

External links
Type strain of Pseudomonas lundensis at BacDive -  the Bacterial Diversity Metadatabase

Pseudomonadales
Bacteria described in 1986